DeShone Allen Kizer (born January 3, 1996) is an American football quarterback who is a free agent. He has played in the National Football League (NFL) for four seasons. He played college football at Notre Dame and was selected by the Cleveland Browns in the second round of the 2017 NFL Draft. Kizer served as the Browns' starter during his rookie season, but his tenure lasted only one year after he went winless and led the league in interceptions. Traded to the Green Bay Packers, he spent one season as a backup in 2018 and also held backup roles with the Las Vegas Raiders and Tennessee Titans.

Early years
Kizer attended Central Catholic High School in Toledo, Ohio. Kizer was named the AP Ohio Division III co-offensive player of the year as a senior in 2013. A three-year starter, Kizer helped lead the Fighting Irish high school football team to a combined 34–6 overall record in 2011–13 (8–2 in playoff games), including a 14–1 record and Ohio Division II state title in 2012. In his career, Kizer's totals included 5,684 passing yards and 56 touchdowns to go with 1,211 rushing yards and 17 touchdowns.

Considered a four-star recruit by Rivals.com, he was rated as the ninth best dual-threat quarterback prospect of his class. On June 11, 2013, Kizer announced his commitment to play college football at the University of Notre Dame.

College career
Kizer redshirted his first year at Notre Dame in 2014 behind quarterbacks Everett Golson and Malik Zaire.

Kizer started 2015 as a backup to Zaire. On September 5, in the season opener, he made his collegiate debut against Texas in relief of Zaire in the 38–3 victory. During the second game of the season against Virginia, Kizer replaced an injured Zaire and helped lead Notre Dame to a victory. With 12 seconds left, Kizer completed a 39-yard touchdown pass to wide receiver Will Fuller to give Notre Dame the lead. After it was announced that Zaire would miss the rest of the season, Kizer was named the starter. On October 3, in a 24–22 loss to Clemson, he passed for a season-high 321 yards, two touchdowns, and one interception while having 15 carries for 60 yards and a rushing touchdown. Against Pitt, Kizer accounted for all six touchdowns (five passing and one rushing) helping Notre Dame to a 42–30 victory. On Halloween, in a 24–20 win over Temple, he recorded 299 passing yards, one touchdown, and two interceptions, and had a stellar night on the ground with 143 rushing yards and two rushing touchdowns. Kizer and the Fighting Irish finished the 2015 regular season with a 10–2 record. On New Year's Day, Kizer and the Fighting Irish closed out their 2015 season with a 44–28 loss to Ohio State in the Fiesta Bowl. In the loss, he had 284 passing yards, two touchdowns, one interception while adding 21 rushing yards and a rushing touchdown on the ground. Overall in 2015, Kizer finished his redshirt first year with 2,880 passing yards, 525 rushing yards, and 31 total touchdowns in 13 games.

Kizer started off the 2016 season with 215 passing yards, five passing touchdowns, 77 rushing yards, and a rushing touchdown in a 2OT 50–47 loss to Texas at Darrell K Royal–Texas Memorial Stadium. After a victory over Nevada, he had 344 passing yards, two passing touchdowns, 14 rushing yards, and two rushing touchdowns in a 36–28 loss to Michigan State. After a loss to Duke, he had a career day through the air with 471 yards and three touchdowns in a 50–33 win over Syracuse. He put together some solid performances over the rest of the season, but the team faltered and ended up with a 4–8 record. Kizer played 12 games with 2,925 passing yards, 472 rushing yards, and 34 total touchdowns. After the 2016 season, Kizer decided to forgo the remaining two years of eligibility and enter the 2017 NFL Draft.

College statistics

Professional career
Kizer received an invitation to the NFL Combine and completed all of the combine drills except for the bench press. He also performed positional drills, but had a disappointing performance. He also participated at Notre Dame's Pro Day and only ran positional drills in front of team scouts and representatives, including San Francisco 49ers general manager John Lynch and Pittsburgh Steelers offensive coordinator Todd Haley. Kizer completed 50/60 pass attempts and showed significantly better accuracy and footwork at his pro day. NFL draft experts and analysts projected him to be a first or second round pick. He was ranked the second best quarterback in the draft by NFL analyst Bucky Brooks, the third best quarterback by NFLDraftScout.com and Sports Illustrated, and was ranked the fourth best quarterback by NFL Network analyst Mike Mayock.

Cleveland Browns

The Cleveland Browns selected Kizer in the second round (52nd overall) of the 2017 NFL Draft. He was the fourth quarterback selected and first taken in the second round. On June 14, 2017, the Browns signed Kizer to a four-year, $4.94 million contract that includes $2.42 million guaranteed and a signing bonus of $1.73 million. On August 27, 2017, following the team's third preseason game, the Browns named Kizer as the starting quarterback to begin the 2017 regular season, beating out veteran trade acquisition Brock Osweiler and second-year quarterbacks Cody Kessler and Kevin Hogan.

Making his NFL debut on September 10, 2017, Kizer finished with 222 passing yards with a touchdown and an interception. He also rushed for 17 yards and a one-yard rushing touchdown, but the Browns lost by a score 21–18 at home to the Pittsburgh Steelers. He orchestrated a 12-play drive that ended when he scored on a 1-yard touchdown run. Kizer's first career passing touchdown was a three-yard pass to wide receiver Corey Coleman in the fourth quarter. He started the next four games for the Browns, which were all losses. During the Week 5 game against the New York Jets, Kizer was benched in favor of Kevin Hogan to begin the third quarter. Hogan was later named the starter for the team's Week 6 game against the Houston Texans. After Hogan's struggles in Week 6, Kizer was renamed the starter for the Week 7. Against the Tennessee Titans in Week 7, Kizer threw for 114 yards and two interceptions before being benched in favor of Cody Kessler in the third quarter. The Browns lost 12–9 in overtime. Following the game, reports surfaced Kizer was out late the Friday before the Titans game, which caused some controversy. During Week 14 against the Green Bay Packers, Kizer threw for 214 yards and a season-high three touchdowns, but also threw two interceptions, including one in overtime that gave the Packers excellent field position. The Browns lost by a score of 27–21. During the season finale against the Steelers in Week 17, Kizer finished with a season-high 314 passing yards, two touchdowns, and an interception as the Browns lost 24–28. The Browns finished the year with an 0–16 record, only the second team in NFL history to have that record.

In 15 starts of his rookie season, Kizer completed 53.6 percent of his passes for 2,894 yards, 11 touchdowns, and a league-leading 22 interceptions. He also rushed for 419 yards and five touchdowns.

Green Bay Packers
On March 14, 2018, Kizer was traded to the Green Bay Packers in exchange for Damarious Randall and a swap of both fourth and fifth-round draft picks.
On September 9, 2018, in Week 1, Kizer played in place of an injured Aaron Rodgers in the first and second quarters against the Chicago Bears. He threw for 55 yards and an interception, which was returned for a touchdown. Rodgers returned in the third quarter and led the Packers to a 24–23 victory. In the season finale against the Detroit Lions, Kizer played in relief of Rodgers, who had suffered a concussion, and threw for 132 yards and an interception as the Packers were shut-out by a score of 31–0.

Kizer was released on August 31, 2019, as part of the final roster cuts.

Oakland / Las Vegas Raiders
On September 1, 2019, Kizer was claimed off waivers by the Oakland Raiders. On May 5, 2020, Kizer was waived by the relocated Las Vegas Raiders. He was re-signed to the Raiders practice squad on September 7, 2020, and was released on September 30.

Tennessee Titans
On November 24, 2020, Kizer was signed to the Tennessee Titans practice squad. He was signed to a futures contract on January 11, 2021.

Kizer entered the 2021 offseason as the third string quarterback competing with backup Logan Woodside for the No. 2 spot behind starter Ryan Tannehill. Kizer was released on August 5, 2021, after the Titans signed quarterback Matt Barkley. He was re-signed to the practice squad on November 26, 2021, but was released three days later.

NFL career statistics

Personal life
His father, Derek Kizer, played basketball at Bowling Green from 1987 to 1991.

Kizer is the founder of One of None, an online marketplace that uses non-fungible tokens (NFTs) to authenticate its products. He is a member of ON_Discourse, a decentralized autonomous organization (DAO) that discusses technology and business.

References

External links

Notre Dame Fighting Irish bio

1996 births
Living people
Players of American football from Ohio
Sportspeople from Toledo, Ohio
African-American players of American football
American football quarterbacks
Notre Dame Fighting Irish football players
Cleveland Browns players
Green Bay Packers players
Las Vegas Raiders players
Oakland Raiders players
Tennessee Titans players
21st-century African-American sportspeople